The Baltic Uplands ( or Nördlicher Landrücken) is a chain of morainic hills about  wide that border the southern Baltic Sea from Jutland to Estonia.

Geography 
To the north they descend steadily into the Gulf of Finland. Towards the east they merge into the Belarusian Ridge; to the southeast they sink gradually into the Polesian depression. To the south the terrain falls away into the extensive Vistula basin. To the west the Uplands are bordered by the North German Plain and in the northwest the terrain drops away westwards from the Schleswig-Holstein Uplands into the North Sea.

The Baltic Uplands are crossed by the rivers Oder, Vistula, Memel and Düna. Their component hill ranges are, from west to east, the Angeln, Schwansen, Hütten Hills, Danish Wahld, Holstein Switzerland, Mecklenburg Switzerland, Pomeranian Lake Plateau (with the Wieżyca), the Masurian Lake District (with the Wzgórza Szeskie and the Lower Lithuanian Ridge.

Economy, tourism, and landscape 
The low, rolling, ground moraine landscape is fertile and supports highly productive arable farming. The chain of lakes and end moraine ridges are popular holiday areas. The poorer, sandy areas are largely covered by pine forest (e. g. Schorfheide, Tucheler Heide, Rominter Heide).

See also 
 East European Plain
 Uplands

References 

Hill ranges of Germany
Landforms of Brandenburg
Landforms of Mecklenburg-Western Pomerania
Landforms of Schleswig-Holstein
Hills of Denmark
Hills of Poland
Landforms of Europe
Highlands